The 2004 United States presidential election in the District of Columbia took place on November 2, 2004, as part of the 2004 United States presidential election. Voters chose three representatives, or electors to the Electoral College, who voted for president and vice president. Prior to the election, Washington DC was considered to be a jurisdiction Kerry would win or safely blue.

As expected, The District of Columbia voted by an extremely large margin in favor of the Democratic candidate John F. Kerry. John F. Kerry won DC by a margin of victory of 79.84% over the incumbent George W. Bush, more than any state.  At the time, this was also the largest Democratic margin of victory over a Republican candidate in the history of the district, but has since been surpassed by all presidential elections since. The greatest victory margin of these subsequent years was in 2016. Such victory margins may perhaps be attributed to the fact that D.C. only encompasses an urban core area (and those are generally very liberal in nature). A recent San Francisco study based on the 2004 presidential election exit polls, ranked Washington, D.C. as the 4th most liberal city in the country. This information supports the fact that the District of Columbia has never voted for a Republican since the ratification of the 23rd Amendment.

As of 2020, this marks the last time that a Democratic presidential nominee would receive less than 90% of the vote in the District of Columbia.

Primaries
 2004 District of Columbia Democratic primary

Predictions
There were 12 news organizations that made state-by-state predictions of the election. Here are their last predictions before election day.

Results

By ward

Electors

Technically the voters of D.C. cast their ballots for electors: representatives to the Electoral College. D.C. is allocated 3 electors. All candidates who appear on the ballot or qualify to receive write-in votes must submit a list of 3 electors, who pledge to vote for their candidate and his or her running mate. Whoever wins the majority of votes in the state is awarded all 3 electoral votes. Their chosen electors then vote for president and vice president. Although electors are pledged to their candidate and running mate, they are not obligated to vote for them. An elector who votes for someone other than his or her candidate is known as a faithless elector.

The electors of each state and the District of Columbia met on December 13, 2004, to cast their votes for president and vice president. The Electoral College itself never meets as one body. Instead the electors from each state and the District of Columbia met in their respective capitols.

The following were the members of the Electoral College from D.C. All were pledged to and voted for John Kerry and John Edwards.
 Linda W. Cropp
 Jack Evans
 Arrington L. Dixon

See also
 United States presidential elections in the District of Columbia

References

External links
Results on D.C. Government site

District of Columbia
2004
2004 elections in Washington, D.C.